Pankaj Mishra FRSL (born 1969) is an Indian essayist, novelist, and socialist political figure.  His non-fiction works include Temptations of the West: How to Be Modern in India, Pakistan, Tibet, and Beyond, From the Ruins of Empire: The Intellectuals Who Remade Asia and A Great Clamour: Encounters with China and Its Neighbours, and has published two novels.  He is a Bloomberg opinion columnist, and prolific contributor to other periodicals such as the Guardian, the New York Times, The New Yorker and the New York Review of Books.  His writings have led to a number of controversies, including disputes with Salil Tripathi, Niall Ferguson and Jordan Peterson.  He was awarded the Windham–Campbell Prize for non-fiction in 2014.

Early life and education
Mishra was born in Jhansi, India. His father was a railway worker and trade unionist after his family had been left impoverished by post-independence land redistribution.

Mishra graduated with a bachelor's degree in commerce from Allahabad University before earning his Master of Arts degree in English literature at the Jawaharlal Nehru University in New Delhi.

Career
In 1992, Mishra moved to Mashobra, a Himalayan village, where he began to contribute literary essays and reviews to The Indian Review of Books, The India Magazine, and the newspaper The Pioneer. His first book, Butter Chicken in Ludhiana: Travels in Small Town India (1995), was a travelogue that described the social and cultural changes in India in the context of globalization. His novel The Romantics (2000), an ironic tale of people longing for fulfilment in cultures other than their own, was published in 11 European languages and won the Los Angeles Times Art Seidenbaum award for first fiction. This novel, with some autobiographical strains, is a bildungsroman. The narrative begins with the nineteen-year-old protagonist Samar coming to the city of Varanasi from Allahabad. A large part of the novel, including its end, is set in Varanasi. Gradually, Samar realizes that the city is a site for mystery.

Mishra's book An End to Suffering: The Buddha in the World (2004) mixes memoir, history, and philosophy while attempting to explore the Buddha's relevance to contemporary times. Temptations of the West: How to Be Modern in India, Pakistan and Beyond (2006), describes Mishra's travels through Kashmir, Bollywood, Afghanistan, Tibet, Nepal, and other parts of South and Central Asia. Responding in The Guardian to an article by Mishra in connection with this work, Salil Tripathi criticised Mishra's defence of Indian and Chinese economic policies from the period 1950-80, claiming that they had stifled economic growth.  Mishra's 2012 book, From the Ruins of Empire, examines the question of "how to find a place of dignity for oneself in this world created by the West, in which the West and its allies in the non-West had reserved the best positions for themselves."

Mishra's anthology of writings on India, India in Mind, was published in  2005. His writings have been anthologised in The Picador Book of Journeys (2000), The Vintage Book of Modern Indian Literature (2004), Away: The Indian Writer as Expatriate (2004), and A History of Indian Literature in English (2003), among many other titles. He has introduced new editions of Rudyard Kipling's Kim (Modern Library), E. M. Forster's A Passage to India (Penguin Classics), J. G. Farrell's The Siege of Krishnapur (NYRB Classics), Gandhi's The Story of My Experiments with Truth (Penguin)  and R. K. Narayan's The Ramayana (Penguin Classics). He has also introduced two volumes of V.S. Naipaul's essays, The Writer and the World and Literary Occasions.

Mishra has written literary and political essays for The New York Times, where he was a Bookends columnist, The New York Review of Books, The Guardian, the London Review of Books, and The New Yorker, among other publications. He is a columnist for Bloomberg View and The New York Times Book Review. His work has also appeared in Foreign Affairs, Foreign Policy, The Boston Globe, Common Knowledge, the Financial Times, Granta, The Independent, The New Republic, the New Statesman, The Wall Street Journal, n+1, The Nation, Outlook, Poetry, Time magazine, The Times Literary Supplement, Travel + Leisure, and The Washington Post. He divides his time between London and India, and is currently working on a novel.

He was the Visiting Fellow for 2007–08 at the Department of English, University College London, UK. He was elected a Fellow of the Royal Society of Literature in 2008. In November 2012, Foreign Policy magazine named him one of the top 100 global thinkers. In February 2015, Prospect nominated him to its list of 50 World Thinkers.

In 2011, Niall Ferguson threatened to sue Mishra for libel after Mishra published a review of his book Civilisation: The West and the Rest in the London Review of Books. Ferguson claimed that Mishra accused him of racism.

In March 2014, Yale University awarded Mishra the Windham–Campbell Literature Prize.

In an article published on 19 March 2018 in the New York Review of Books titled "Jordan Peterson & Fascist Mysticism", Mishra wrote that Canadian clinical psychologist and author Jordan Peterson's activities with Charles Joseph, a native member of the coastal Pacific Kwakwakaʼwakw tribe in Canada, "...may seem the latest in a long line of eggheads pretentiously but harmlessly romancing the noble savage." Peterson perceived Mishra's use of the phrase "romancing the noble savage" as a racist insult to his friend Joseph, and his response via Twitter, which included a threat of violence to Mishra, went viral.

Run and Hide, Mishra's first novel in 20 years, was published in 2022 to a generally positive reception, with Allan Massie in The Scotsman concluding: "This is a wonderfully rich and enjoyable novel. It is very much, and disturbingly, of our time.... Intellect, observation memory, sympathy and imagination are all happily here. The novel can be read quickly for sheer pleasure. It is a work for our time and one that will surely be read many years on for what will then be its historical interest. So: a novel built to last."

Personal life
He married Mary Mount, a London book editor, in 2005. She is daughter of the writer Sir Ferdinand Mount, 3rd Baronet, and a cousin of former Prime Minister of the United Kingdom David Cameron. Mishra has been critical of Cameron's politics and has stated "It may seem to people like we’re having dinner together practically every night, but I’ve never met the man; my wife has met him once in her life. Neither of us share his politics...", calling Cameron "a ghastly figure".

Awards and recognition
 2000: Art Seidenbaum award for Best First Fiction
 2013: Crossword Book Award (nonfiction) for From the Ruins of Empire. 
 2014: Leipzig Book Award for European Understanding for From the Ruins of Empire
 2014: Windham–Campbell Literature Prize (Nonfiction), valued at $150,000 one of the largest prizes in the world of its kind.
 2014: Premi Internacional D'Assaig Josep Palau i Fabre

Bibliography

Books
 Butter Chicken in Ludhiana: Travels in Small Town India (1995)
 The Romantics (2000)
 An End to Suffering: the Buddha in the World (2004)
 India in Mind, edited by Pankaj Mishra (2005)
 Temptations of the West: How to Be Modern in India, Pakistan, Tibet, and Beyond (2006)
 From the Ruins of Empire: The Intellectuals Who Remade Asia (2012)
 A Great Clamour: Encounters with China and Its Neighbours (2013)
 Age of Anger: A History of the Present (2017), 
 Bland Fanatics: Liberals, Race, and Empire (2020), 
 Run and Hide (2022), ISBN 9780374607524

Book chapters
 Introduction to Kashmir: The Case for Freedom (2011)

Essays and reporting
 Mishra, Pankaj. (9 April 1998). "Edmund Wilson in Benares", The New York Review of Books. 
 — (24 June 2004). "The Invention of the Hindu", Axess Magazine.
 
 
 
 
 — (19 November 2020).  "Grand Illusions." The New York Review of Books. 67 (18): 31–32. Essay.

Book reviews

See also
 List of Indian writers

References

External links

 Official website
 "Pankaj Mishra: history lessons must not become empire triumphalism – video" – interview at The Guardian
 Philosopher King by Adam Goodheart – book review in The New York Times
 "Pankaj Mishra, Intellectual and Spiritual Vagrant" – interview by Wendy Cheng at Loggernaut
 "Pankaj Mishra in conversation with Hirsh Sawhney" – interview by Hirsh Sawhney at the Brooklyn Rail
 Pankaj Mishra – interview by Sarah Fay for "The Believer", 2007
 Podcast of Pankaj Mishra and Arundhati Roy discussing "India in the World" at the Shanghai International Literary Festival
 "Turning the Mirror: A View From the East – A conversation with Pankaj Mishra", Ideas Roadshow, 2013
"A View From the East" – Pankaj Mishra in conversation with Hirsh Sawhney (December 2012), Brooklyn Rail
 

Reviews and articles
 Pankaj Mishra at The New York Review of Books
 Pankaj Mishra at The Guardian
 Pankaj Mishra at The New Yorker
 Pankaj Mishra at Outlook
 Pankaj Mishra at Bloomberg L.P.
 Pankaj Mishra at The London Review of Books 

1969 births
20th-century Indian essayists
20th-century Indian journalists
20th-century Indian male writers
20th-century Indian novelists
21st-century Indian male writers
21st-century Indian novelists
21st-century Indian essayists
Fellows of the Royal Society of Literature
Indian columnists
Indian male journalists
Indian male novelists
Indian travel writers
Jawaharlal Nehru University alumni
Journalists from Uttar Pradesh
Indian male essayists
Living people
Mount family
Novelists from Uttar Pradesh
People from Jhansi
The New Yorker people
University of Allahabad alumni